was a Japanese daimyō of the early Edo period.

Biography
Tadatoshi was the son of Aoyama Tadanari, a Tokugawa vassal of the Sengoku period who was born in Mikawa Province. Tadatoshi, like his father, was a Tokugawa vassal, and was famous for his role as the third shōgun Iemitsu's teacher.

He became a daimyō in 1603, when Tokugawa Ieyasu granted him the domain of Edosaki.

Notes

|-

|-

References
 Aoyama family history and biographical notes

Further reading
 Bolitho, Harold. (1974). Treasures Among Men: The Fudai Daimyo in Tokugawa Japan. New Haven: Yale University Press.  ;  OCLC 185685588
Kodama Kōta 児玉幸多, Kitajima Masamoto 北島正元 (1966). Kantō no shohan 関東の諸藩. Tokyo: Shin Jinbutsu Ōraisha.

1578 births
1643 deaths
Fudai daimyo
Rōjū